The James City Formation is a geologic formation in North Carolina. It preserves fossils.

See also

 List of fossiliferous stratigraphic units in North Carolina

References
 

Geologic formations of North Carolina